Nasi kucing (also known as  (sěgá kucing) and often translated cat rice or cat's rice) is an Indonesian rice dish that originated in Central Java, primarily in the Yogyakarta, Semarang, and Surakarta areas but has since spread throughout the country. It consists of a small portion of rice with toppings, usually sambal, dried fish, and tempeh, wrapped in banana leaves.

Etymology
The term nasi kucing, literally meaning "cat rice" or "cat's rice", is derived from its portion size; it is similar in size to what the Javanese would serve to a pet cat, hence the name.

Origin
Nasi kucing originated in the Yogyakarta, Semarang, and Surakarta areas, but has since spread to Jakarta, other parts of the country, and as far as Mecca, sold by Indonesian workers during the hajj.

Presentation
Nasi kucing consists of a small, fist-sized portion of rice along with toppings. Common toppings include sambal, dried fish, and tempeh. Other ingredients can include egg, chicken, and cucumber. It is served ready-made, wrapped in a banana leaf, which is further wrapped in paper.

A variation of nasi kucing, sega macan is three times the size of a regular portion of nasi kucing. It is served with roasted rice, dried fish, and vegetables. Like nasi kucing, sega macan is served wrapped in a banana leaf and paper.

Sales

This has led to angkringan being considered the "lowest class of eatery".

The owners of the angkringan themselves often come from lower socio-economic classes, may have few or no marketable skills, or originate from remote villages. From the daily net profits of  – , the seller repays the patron until the debt is repaid and the seller is able to operate independently.

See also

Nasi bogana
Nasi campur
Nasi goreng
Nasi kuning
Nasi liwet
Nasi pecel
Nasi uduk
Nasi ulam

References

Bibliography

Javanese cuisine
Indonesian rice dishes